Jérôme Romain (born June 12, 1971 in Saint-Martin, France) is a former world-class track and field athlete who competed mainly in the triple jump.

Born on Saint-Martin, a French overseas territory in the Caribbean, Romain represented Dominica before he became a French citizen in 1999.

Romain competed collegiately for Blinn College and the University of Arkansas. He graduated from Arkansas in 1996 with a bachelor's degree in kinesiology/athletic training. He received his master's degree in kinesiology/exercise science from Arkansas in 2000.

Romain was the assistant coach for jumps at the University of Wisconsin–Madison for four years following his graduation. He then became the jumps coach at Brown University in Providence, Rhode Island.

In 2008, Romain was selected to coach the Dominica track and field team at the 2008 Summer Olympics in Beijing. In addition, he was given the honor of carrying the national flag at the Opening Ceremonies. Romain is now the assistant jumps coach at the University of Tennessee.

Competition record

Personal bests
Outdoor
Triple jump - 17.59 m (1995)
Long jump - 7.90 m (1993)
100 metres - 10.70 (1992)

Indoor
Triple jump - 17.03 m (1998)

World rankings
Romain was ranked among the top ten triple jumpers in the world by Track and Field News on four occasions:

References

External links

1971 births
Living people
French male triple jumpers
French male long jumpers
Dominica male long jumpers
Dominica triple jumpers
Athletes (track and field) at the 1996 Summer Olympics
Olympic athletes of Dominica
University of Arkansas alumni
Arkansas Razorbacks men's track and field athletes
Pan American Games silver medalists for Dominica
Pan American Games medalists in athletics (track and field)
Commonwealth Games competitors for Dominica
Athletes (track and field) at the 1994 Commonwealth Games
Athletes (track and field) at the 1995 Pan American Games
World Athletics Championships medalists
World Athletics Championships athletes for Dominica
World Athletics Championships athletes for France
Competitors at the 1998 Goodwill Games
Medalists at the 1995 Pan American Games